Boulsin may refer to:

Boulsin, Bazèga, Burkina Faso
Boulsin, Boulkiemdé, Burkina Faso